Thomas Gerstle Abernethy (May 16, 1903 – June 11, 1998) was an American lawyer and politician who served as a member of the United States House of Representatives from Mississippi for 15 terms from 1943 to 1973.

Biography

Early life
Thomas Gerstle Abertheny was born on May 16, 1903 in Eupora, Mississippi. He attended the local public schools. He studied at the University of Alabama, and the University of Mississippi, and graduated from Cumberland School of Law in 1924.

Career
He was admitted to the bar and started practicing in his hometown through 1929, when he moved to Okolona, Mississippi. He served as the district attorney for the third judicial district of Mississippi from 1936 through 1942.

In 1942, he was elected as a Democrat to the United States House of Representatives, where he served through 1973. He retired to live in Okolona, Mississippi, and Jackson, Mississippi, until he died in 1998.

Having been a signatory to the 1956 Southern Manifesto that opposed the desegregation of public schools ordered by the Supreme Court in Brown v. Board of Education, in 1964 he voted against the passage of the Civil Rights Act.

He is also notable for having made the first public citation of the anti-semitic hoax A Racial Program for the Twentieth Century, on June 7, 1957, during a debate on the Civil Rights Act of 1957, when he read a quotation from it into the congressional record and claimed it as proof that the Civil rights movement was a foreign communist plot.

During his career, he proposed a number of constitutional amendments relating to school prayer and elections of the President and Vice President.

Death
He died on June 11, 1998.

References

External links

The Thomas Abernethy Collection (MUM00001) owned by the University of Mississippi

1903 births
1998 deaths
People from Eupora, Mississippi
University of Alabama alumni
University of Mississippi alumni
Cumberland University alumni
20th-century American politicians
People from Okolona, Mississippi
American segregationists
American anti-communists
Democratic Party members of the United States House of Representatives from Mississippi